Inanidrilus falcifer is a species of annelid worm. It is known from subtidal silty coral sands on the Caribbean side of Barbados, in the Atlantic Ocean.

References

falcifer
Fauna of Barbados
Fauna of the Atlantic Ocean
Animals described in 1982